Arena Indios was a football stadium project in Ciudad Juárez, in the Mexican state of Chihuahua, which was planned to be the Indios de Ciudad Juárez Stadium.

In a press presentation it was informed about the type of facilities which will be featured by Arena Indios. The main is its facade, which resembles more a mall than a football stadium. The stadium will also have a capacity of 40,000 spectators, plus 2 giant screens and VIP boxes.  It will replace their current stadium, Estadio Olímpico Benito Juárez.

The holder of the Secretariat of Social Development said that one of the core parts of the State Government is supporting the development of sport and that better be involved in a project such as football in Primera División with Indios de Ciudad Juárez in Ciudad Juárez.

However, after struggling with financial issues, at the end of the 2011 season, the Femexfut announced in December 2011 that the club was being disbanded, shelving the project for the stadium completely.

References 
MasNoticias.net - proyecto Arena Indios de la Primera División "A"
Club Indios official website - El Boleto Es Compromiso

Football venues in Mexico
Unbuilt stadiums
Sports venues in Chihuahua (state)
Unbuilt buildings and structures in Mexico